Junín is a city in the province of Buenos Aires, Argentina, and administrative seat of the partido of Junín. It is mostly known for being the hometown of former first lady of Argentina Eva Perón.

History
Inhabited by the native Charrúa people, the site's strategic location on the Salado River made it of interest to Spanish Viceroy Juan José de Vértiz y Salcedo, who established an outpost there in the 1790s as part of a line of defense against raids by displaced natives. The location became known as El Potroso.

El Potroso was reinforced by a fort by way of an 1826 decree by President Bernardino Rivadavia, and on December 27, 1827, the citadel was established under the command of a veteran of the Argentine War of Independence, Bernardino Escribano, as Fuerte de la Federación. The advent of Buenos Aires Province Governor Juan Manuel de Rosas led to Escribano's 1829 destitution as commander; though the intervention of an officer, Isidoro Suárez, averted a bloodbath. Suárez, a veteran of one of the last battles of the War for Independence (the Battle of Junín, in Perú), inadvertently gave the failing settlement its new name by his actions: "Junín."

Political conflict and ongoing Indian raids had all but destroyed Junín by the 1830s, however, and this prompted Governor Rosas to send the remaining settlers provisions and to subsidize crop farming in the surrounding, fertile pampas fields. This was followed by a pact with Ranquel Chief Santiago Yanquelén, whereby his people would defend Junín against raids by other tribes. Towards the end of his rule, Rosas appointed José Seguí, among the few Afro Argentines to achieve a commissioned officer's rank, to administer Junín, in 1851. Seguí was an efficient, though repressive commander, and in 1863, he was assassinated at his nearby ranch.

Rosas' 1852 overthrow resulted in the appointment of a justice of the peace, who initially shared governing duties with the military commander.  Junín's first general store (Basterreix) opened in 1860, and in 1861, Junín elected its first city council (despite being officially only a fort). The province designated the area as a county in 1864, and with nearly 2,000 inhabitants, Junín ceases to be categorized as a "fort," and its first municipal master plan was laid out in 1865.

The 1880 arrival of the Central Argentine Railway and that of the Buenos Aires and Pacific Railway (B.A.& P.) in 1884 led to the town's rapid growth. The National Bank of Argentina had opened a branch there in 1892 and by the 1895 census, Junín was home to over 12,000. The town largest employer by then was the B.A.& P.'s rail equipment factory, which employed over 1,600. The City Hall was completed in 1904 and Junín was declared a "city," in 1906.

Junín's steady development over the subsequent decades and setting amid lakes made it a well-known regional tourist destination. A hunting club was established in 1938, and a fishermen's pier and club on Lake El Carpincho, in 1942.  The Aero Club Junín (1940) became well known following the IX International Gliding Competition, in 1963, and the nearby Borchex Municipal Park and Lake Gómez both have become popular weekend destinations since the 1960s; Lake Gómez attracted around 350,000 visitors during the 2006-07 summer season. Nearby Estancia La Oriental has attracted growing rural tourism to the area, as well.

The city is home to an important Municipal Historical Museum, probably best known for its paleontology hall and its wooly mammoth fossils, and the Ángel María de Rosa Municipal Museum of Art (1944). In a bid to further diversify the city's economy, an industrial park was authorized north of the city in 1995, and a racetrack, the Autódromo Eusebio Marcilla, was opened in 2003. The closure of much of Argentina's passenger rail service during the 1990s was partly offset in Junín in part by the purchase of local rail facilities by América Latina Logística, a São Paulo-based rail transport provider operating largely in Argentina, as well as by establishment of the Junín Railworks Cooperative.

The city features numerous cinemas, as well as prominent stage theatres such as the Teatro de la Ranchería (1971). The city's first institution of higher learning, the Junín Regional University (CURJ), was established in 1990; fused with its nearby, Pergamino counterpart, it became the National University of Northwestern Buenos Aires (UNNOBA), in 2002. The public Dr. Abraham Piñeyro Emergency Hospital, opened in 1930, serves as the city's principal health care establishment; a new wing was added to the facility in 1997.
  
Famous people from Junín include Argentine supermodel Yesica Toscanini, Tour de France cyclist Juan Antonio Flecha, football greats such as coach Osvaldo Zubeldía, forward Atilio García and goalie Federico Vilar, the "wild bull of the pampas," boxer Luis Ángel Firpo and Elvira Rawson de Dellepiane, a militant suffragist and the second woman to receive a medical degree in Argentina; Junín was also where Eva Duarte was raised until an opportunity in radio took her to Buenos Aires, in 1935. A decade later, she became the influential Eva Perón (Evita).

A fellow UCR figure, Moisés Lebensohn, founded the city's leading news daily, Democracia, in 1931.

The city's mayor, elected in 2015, is Pablo Petrecca of Cambienos-PRO.

Gallery

Climate
Junín has a humid subtropical climate (Köppen climate classification Cfa). Winters are characterized with moderate temperatures during the day and cold nights. During this time of the year, overcast days are more common, averaging 9–11 days per month although sunny days are common as well with 7-11 clear days per month from June to September. Spring and fall are transition seasons featuring warm daytime temperatures and cool nighttime temperatures and are highly variable with some days reaching  and below . Summers are hot during the day while nights are mild. They tend to be sunnier than the other seasons, averaging 8–11 clear days with less overcast days (only 6 per month). The average relative humidity is 75%, with the summer months being drier than the winter months. The average first date of frost is on May 20 while the last date of frost is on September 11. This can vary from year to year with frosts that can extend into November or occur as early as April. On average, Junín receives  of precipitation per year with 85 days with measureable precipitation with summer months being more wetter than the winter months, where most of the precipitation falls in the form of thunderstorms. Junín receives approximately 2,569.3 hours of bright sunshine per year or 57% of possible sunshine per year, ranging from a low of 46% in June (only 138.0 hours of sunshine per month) to a high of 66% in  both January and February.

Transportation
The city is served by Junín Airport, which has no commercial air service but has had so in the past.

Notable people  
 Juan Antonio Flecha, cyclist
 Luis Angel Firpo, boxer
 Eva Perón, Argentine First Lady

References

External links

Municipal website 
Diario Democracia – online newspaper and portal of the Junín area 
Diario La Verdad – online newspaper 

Populated places in Buenos Aires Province
Populated places established in 1827
Junín Partido
Cities in Argentina
1827 establishments in Argentina
Argentina